Ivana Iozzia (born 18 February 1973 in Como) is an Italian female marathon runner.

Biography
She won the Maratona di Sant'Antonio in 2005 and won the Italian Marathon in 2012 at age 39. She underwent a liver operation in 2011 and was pleased to return to good form with her run of 2:35:08 hours.  She is a three-time national champion in the event.

She won Zermatt marathon in 2017 and 2018.

National records
 30 km (road): 1:47:50 ( Lugano, 20 September 2009) - Current holder

Achievements

National titles
She has won 3 times the individual national championship.
3 wins in the marathon (2005, 2007, 2012)

See also
 Italian records in athletics

References

External links
 
 Ivana Iozzia at All-athletics.com

1973 births
Living people
Italian female marathon runners
Italian female long-distance runners
Italian female mountain runners
20th-century Italian women
21st-century Italian women